Elophila sinicalis is a moth in the family Crambidae. It was described by George Hampson in 1897. It is found in Japan on Honshu, Kyushu and the Gotō Islands, in China and Korea.

The length of the forewings is 7.3–8.3 mm for males and 7.5–8.7 mm for females. Adults are sexually dimorphic, with males being paler than females.

Full-grown larvae reach a length of 12–16 mm.

References

Acentropinae
Moths described in 1897
Moths of Asia